Conus maculiferus is a species of sea snail, a marine gastropod mollusk in the family Conidae, the cone snails, cone shells or cones.

These snails are predatory and venomous. They are capable of "stinging" humans.

Description
The size of the shell attains 30 mm. The shell is wide, with a short spire and slightly coronate. Its color is yellowish white with two revolving series of irregular longitudinal chestnut markings, which are sometimes partially connected one with another in each series.

Distribution
This marine species occurs in the Red Sea.

References

  Petit, R. E. (2009). George Brettingham Sowerby, I, II & III: their conchological publications and molluscan taxa. Zootaxa. 2189: 1–218
 Puillandre N., Duda T.F., Meyer C., Olivera B.M. & Bouchet P. (2015). One, four or 100 genera? A new classification of the cone snails. Journal of Molluscan Studies. 81: 1-23

External links
 To World Register of Marine Species
 Cone Shells - Knights of the Sea

maculiferus
Gastropods described in 1833